Silence Followed by a Deafening Roar is the second full length instrumental album and 8th overall by hard rock guitarist Paul Gilbert.

Track listing

Track 2 ends with a complete performance of Bach's Prelude in G major from the Well-Tempered Clavier Book 1.

Musicians
 Paul Gilbert - Guitar, Producer
 Mike Szuter - Bass
 Jeff Bowders - Drums
 Emi Gilbert - Hammond B3, Piano

Production
 Pat Sullivan - Mastering
 Stan Katayama - Engineer, Mixing
 June Murakawa - Engineer

References

External links
 KvltSite.com's review

Paul Gilbert albums
Instrumental albums
2008 albums
Shrapnel Records albums